Shemseddin Mervezi, also known as Shams al-Dīn al-Marwazī (1077) was the court astronomer for the Seljuq sultan Ahmad Sanjar at Merv. Mervezi's work  (The Book of Stars) was one of the first books to describe the heavens.

 was published in the Turkmen language for the first time in 2006, having been prepared for publication using manuscripts stored in Istanbul and Vienna. The translation from the Arabic by experts from the Miras National Cultural Heritage Centre and the National Institute of Manuscripts of Turkmenistan. An initial run of 5,000 copies was produced.

Mervezi was born in 1077 near Merv, a centre of science and culture of that time, now modern Mary, Turkmenistan. He died aged 62.

Mervezi's  includes his own astronomical observations of himself, as well as information about the night sky produced by his contemporaries. It used accessible language to describe the behaviour of the stars and the planets, was one of first texts about astronomy.

References

Further reading

External links
 Statue of Muhammet Musa Horezmi, Semseddin Merwezi and Mahmyt Palwan in Turkmenistan's capital, Ashgabat

Astronomers of the medieval Islamic world
1077 births